Laurence Durkie McBain (7 December 1907 – 20 September 1937) was a Scottish professional footballer who made over 100 appearances in the Scottish League for St Johnstone as a forward. He also played for Queen's Park, Dundee United and Raith Rovers and was capped by Scotland at amateur level.

References 

Scottish footballers
Queen's Park F.C. players
Scottish Football League players
Scotland amateur international footballers
1907 births
Sportspeople from St Andrews
1937 deaths
Association football forwards
Raith Rovers F.C. players
St Johnstone F.C. players
Dundee United F.C. players
Footballers from Fife